Reza Lak Aliabadi (born 15 April 1976) is an Iranian professional futsal coach and former player. He is currently head coach of Crop in the Iranian Futsal Super League.

Honours

Team

Managerial Club 
 Iranian Futsal Super League
 Champion (3): 2010–11 (Shahid Mansouri) – 2011–12 (Shahid Mansouri) – 2016–17 (Giti Pasand)
 Runner-Up (1): 2013–14 (Giti Pasand)
 Third-Place (2): 2005–06 (Rah Ahan) – 2012–13 (Shahid Mansouri)
 AFC Futsal Club Championship
 Runner-Up (1): 2011 (Shahid Mansouri) – 2013 (Giti Pasand)

Individual 
 Best Manager
 Iranian Futsal Super League: 2016–17 (Giti Pasand)

References 

1976 births
Living people
People from Tehran
Iranian men's futsal players
Iranian futsal coaches
Shensa Saveh FSC players
Shahid Mansouri FSC players
Shahid Mansouri FSC managers
Giti Pasand FSC managers